Qu'est-ce qu'on attend pour être heureux! (also known as What Are We Waiting for to Be Happy!) is a 1982 French comedy film  written and directed by Coline Serreau and starring Henri Garcin.

The film was screened at the 39th edition of the Venice Film Festival.

Plot

Cast 
 Henri Garcin  as The Film Director
 Évelyne Buyle as Jean Harlow 
 Pierre Vernier as Rudolph Valentino 
 Romain Bouteille as Joachim
 André Julien	as M. Tiermond
 Annick Alane as Lulu
 Bernard Alane as The product manager
 Michel Berto as Mr. Everybody
 Laure Duthilleul as The dresser
 Elisabeth Wiener
 Tanya Lopert

References

External links

1982 comedy films
1982 films
Films directed by Coline Serreau
French comedy films
1980s French films